Albert Bartlett Bickford (24 August 1887 – 23 December 1971) was an Australian rules footballer who played with Carlton and Melbourne in the Victorian Football League (VFL).

Playing career

Originally from Essendon Association, Bickford made one appearance for Carlton in each of the 1906 and 1907 seasons, both premiership years. He then transferred to Melbourne and played eight games in the 1908 VFL season, followed by a single appearance in 1909.

Bickford is the brother of Carlton and Essendon footballer Edric Bickford, brother-in-law of former Carlton captain Rod McGregor and uncle of Melbourne premiership player George Bickford.

Umpiring career

Bickford was appointed to the VFL list of field umpires in 1921. In round one that season, as a boundary umpire, he made his only appearance in a VFL match - Richmond versus Carlton - earning Heritage Number 129. Between 1921 and 1929 he umpired 120 country matches as a field umpire including the 1926 Heathcote District Football Association Grand Final.

References

1887 births
Carlton Football Club players
Melbourne Football Club players
Essendon Association Football Club players
Australian Football League umpires
Australian rules footballers from Melbourne
1971 deaths
People from Flemington, Victoria